The Progressive Party of Belgium (French: Parti Progressiste) was a progressive liberal party which existed from 1887 until 1900.

History
The Belgian Liberal party in the 1860s and 1870s had a strong progressive wing in the cities, which in the 1870s even dominated Belgian liberalism.
After the defeat of the Liberal party in the general elections of 1884 the doctrinarian-bourgeois faction continued to dominate the Belgian Liberal party. However, the progressistes or radicals no longer wanted to toe the line. In 1887 they established their own party, the Parti Progressiste, with Paul Janson as its president. Although the radicals shared some ideas with the socialist Parti Ouvrier Belge (POB), they rejected universal suffrage. 

Over the years, it became more radical in its views and in 1894, they asked for the creation of a Ministry of Labour, the creation of maximum hours for a working day, and compulsory insurance against accidents, disease, unemployment and disability. More important still, it envisaged the creation of a true public sector by the nationalization of the railroads, canals, roads, bridges and coal mines and by the replacement of the national bank by a bank of state, etc. They reunited with the Liberal Party in 1900, which made many concessions to the radicals.

See also
 Politics of Belgium
 Liberalism in Belgium
 Liberal Archive
 Belgian Labour Party (BWP/POB)
 Christene Volkspartij

References

Sources
 In de oppositie (1884-1914) (Dutch)
 Lauwers,N., Georges Lorand (1860-1918): Een transnationale progressieve liberaal; VUB; 2016

Defunct political parties in Belgium
Liberal parties in Belgium
1887 establishments in Belgium
Political parties established in 1887
1900 disestablishments in Belgium
Political parties disestablished in 1900
Radical parties